Afrika may refer to:

Arts and entertainment
 Afrika (video game), for PlayStation 3
 "Afrika" (song), by Električni Orgazam
 A.F.R.I.K.A., a 2002 South Korean film
 Afrika (film), a 1973 Italian film

People 
 Afrika (artist) (born 1966), Russian artist
 Afrika Bambaataa (Lance Taylor, born 1957), American DJ, rapper, and producer
 Cecil Afrika (born 1988), South African rugby player
 Tatamkhulu Afrika (1920-2002), South African poet and writer

Other uses
 Afrika, a fashion line by M.I.A.
 Russian cruiser Afrika, a cruiser of the Imperial Russian Navy

See also

 Africa (disambiguation)
 Afrika Korps, the German expeditionary force in Africa in World War II
 McAfrika, a former McDonald's hamburger